Environmental issues in Liberia include the deforestation of tropical rainforest, the hunting of endangered species for bushmeat, the pollution of rivers and coastal waters from industrial run-off and raw sewage, and the burning and dumping of household waste.

Like other countries Africa, Liberia is also especially vulnerable to climate change, exacerbating existing environmental issues.

Poaching of endangered species for consumption as bushmeat 

Endangered species are hunted for human consumption as bushmeat in Liberia. Species hunted for food in Liberia include elephants, pygmy hippopotamus, chimpanzees, leopards, duikers, and monkeys. Forest rangers in Liberia say that bushmeat poachers will kill any forest animal they encounter.

Bushmeat is widely eaten in Liberia, and is considered a delicacy. A 2004 public opinion survey found that bushmeat ranked second behind fish amongst residents of the capital Monrovia as a preferred source of protein. Of households where bushmeat was served, 80% of residents said they cooked it "once in a while," while 13% cooked it once a week and 7% cooked bushmeat daily. The survey was conducted during the last civil war, and bushmeat consumption is now believed to be far higher.

Poachers hunt protected species inside Liberia's national parks, including the Sapo and Gola rainforest parks. The poachers mostly hunt using snares and wire traps. The head of conservation at the Liberian government Forest Development Authority said when interviewed that a single hunter may set between 200 and 300 traps and not return to them for two to three weeks - leaving the caught animals to a prolonged death. Bushmeat is often exported to neighboring Sierra Leone and Ivory Coast, despite a ban on the cross-border sale of wild animals.

It is illegal to kill protected species like chimpanzees and elephants in Liberia. However, forest rangers are not allowed to carry guns, and are understaffed. Prosecution of poachers is also hampered by weak anti-poaching legislation.

Deforestation 
Liberia is a global biodiversity hotspot - a significant reservoir of biodiversity that is under threat from humans.  Liberia contains a significant portion of West Africa's remaining rainforest, with about 43% of the Upper Guinean forest - an important forest that spans several West African nations.

Slash-and-burn agriculture is one of the human activities eroding Liberia's natural forests. A 2004 UN report estimated that between 1990 and 2004, forest cover in Liberia had fallen by around seven percent to just over 31 per cent of Liberia's total area.

Illegal logging has increased in Liberia since the end of the Second Civil War in 2003. In 2012 President Ellen Johnson Sirleaf granted licenses to companies to cut down 58% of all the primary rainforest left in Liberia. After international protests, many of those logging permits were cancelled.

Liberia and Norway struck an agreement in September 2014 whereby Liberia ceases all logging in exchange for $150 million in development aid. Liberia agreed to place 30% or more of its forests under protected area status by 2020. It will also pilot direct payments to communities for protecting the forest. Norway will seek independent verification that trees remain standing before payments are made. However, subsequent reports by environmental and watchdog groups suggest that this program may have accelerated some elements of deforestation.

In 2004, a United Nations Environment Program report estimated that 99 per cent of Liberians burnt charcoal and fuel wood for cooking and heating, resulting in deforestation. The report found that Liberia was beginning to export charcoal in the region. Coastal mangrove swamps were also being burnt for fuel, removing nursery grounds for fish and the mangroves role as a natural flood defence.

Liberia had a 2018 Forest Landscape Integrity Index mean score of 4.79/10, ranking it 116th globally out of 172 countries.

Water quality

Pollution in Monrovia 

Pollution is a significant issue in Liberia's capital city- Monrovia. Piles of household and industrial rubbish in Monrovia build up and are not always collected by sanitation companies paid by the World Bank to collect this waste. In 2009 the World Bank stated that its goal was to increase collection and disposal to 45 percent of Monrovia's daily generated waste by December 2013, an increase of 15 percentage points from 2009.

In 2013, the problem of uncollected rubbish became so acute in the Paynesville area of Monrovia that traders and residents burnt "the huge garbage piles that seemed on the verge of cutting off the main road" out of Monrovia to Kakata.

During Liberia's civil wars, Monrovia went without any formal garbage collection service for 17 years. Residents burnt, buried or dumped their household waste. Swamps near the city were filled with rubbish, and garbage was used to extend riverbanks. The Fiamah neighborhood in central Monrovia was an uncontrolled dump site for the entire city.

Rubbish blocked drains and sewers, causing flooding and stagnant water in which mosquitoes were able to breed. Estimates of only the most evident rubbish piles around the city amounted to more than 70,000 tons of solid waste on the streets. Since 2006 the international community has paid for all rubbish collection and disposal in Monrovia via the World Bank.

Frequent flooding brings environmental problems to residents of Monrovia, as flood water mixes with and carries waste found in swamps that are often on the verge of residential areas.

Other 
The 2004 UN report also said that there was an urgent need to salvage damaged and sunken ships in major ports and coastal sites around Liberia for both environmental and safety reasons.

Sanitation 

In 2008, one in 25 Liberians had access to a toilet, with most using the nearest bush or beach.

In 2009, one-third of Monrovia's 1.5 million people had access to clean toilets. Those without their own toilets defecate in the narrow alley-ways between their houses, on the beach, or into plastic bags, which they dump on nearby piles of rubbish or into the sea.

Congested housing, no requirement that landlords provide working toilets, and virtually no urban planning "have combined to create lethal sanitation conditions in the capital". The poor infrastructure "means toilet-users may have to use up to four gallons of water each time they flush", according to a civil servant interviewed by IRIN News in 2008. “At US 25 cents a gallon, for some it is a choice between flushing and affording to buy food at the end of the day”.

Most Liberians are forced to buy all their water from street vendors at inflated prices. “When some of my neighbours defecate they cannot get enough water to flush their toilets, so they sometimes throw the faeces around the place, exposing us all to health hazards,” Monrovia shopkeeper Samuel Tweh told IRIN. Without regular running water, waste flushed into the system often backs up, causing sewage to spill out of manholes into the streets.

In slums like West Point, 70,000 residents have access to four public toilets. In 2009, a visit to a toilet in West Point cost 2.5 US cents. The young men running the latrines said there were around 500 users a day. The facilities "can be smelled 50 metres away, with the floor of each squalid cubicle 15cm deep in soiled newspaper that residents use to wipe their posteriors. Staff use gloved hands to scoop the used paper into a wheelbarrow, which they dump in the nearby river or beach".

Mining 
In a 2004 UN environmental report, it was estimated that there were around 5,000 unlicensed and 1,000 licensed mining operations in Liberia. The report said the mines caused damage through the excavation of forests and riverbeds. The report noted that pollutants such as cyanide were used in the mining process, with the cyanide entering rivers. Mercury used in the extraction of gold from ore was also a pollutant mentioned.

Overfishing 
See Overfishing in West Africa

Climate change

See also 
 Wildlife of Liberia

References 

Environment of Liberia
Liberia